WAMZ (97.5 FM) is a country music-formatted radio station located in Louisville, Kentucky. The station broadcasts with an ERP of 100 kW.  The station's studios are located in the central part of Watterson Park and the transmitter site is in Brooks.

Station history
Experimental W9XEK began on July 22, 1944 at 45.5 MHz (on the original FM band). A second sister FM station was established on April 20, 1947 on the newer FM band when WCJT started at 99.7 FM as the sister station to WHAS 840. The call sign represented the initials of The Courier Journal and Louisville Times, all of which were owned by the Bingham family. By the following year, W9XEK was taken off the air and WCJT became WHAS-FM.  FM was still an infant technology, however, and as most early FM licensees did in the early 1950s, the Binghams returned WHAS-FM's license to the FCC on December 31, 1950. The 99.7 frequency later became the home for WKLO-FM (now WDJX).

On September 7, 1966, the second WHAS-FM began broadcasting at 97.5 FM with a 100 kW physical plant and an automated classical music format. Since the station carried little or no advertising, it was mainly a civic service by the Bingham family. This format lasted until September 3, 1975, when WHAS-FM was renamed WNNS and adopted the NBC Radio Network's "News and Information Service" (NIS) format. Public station WFPK, which by that point had also run a classical programming schedule for years, received the WHAS-FM music inventory as a donation from the Binghams.

At midnight on February 28, 1977, on the heels of the announcement that NBC's NIS format would be discontinued, the format was changed to automated country, using Drake-Chenault's "Great American Country" format under the WAMZ callsign. Although automated, the station became the first country FM in Louisville. The first song played on WAMZ was "She's Just An Old Love Turned Memory" by Charley Pride.

In 1979, radio personality Coyote Calhoun (best known at the time for his previous air work at Top 40 powerhouse WAKY) was hired as the program director/morning host. Under his leadership, WAMZ became one of the most-successful country radio stations in the U.S. Coyote Calhoun retired on December 3, 2014 after 35 years at WAMZ.

WAMZ presently broadcasts in HD Radio.

WAMZ is owned by iHeartMedia, which (as Clear Channel Communications) acquired it and sister WHAS in 1986.

References

External links
 official website

 WAMZ page at LKYRadio.com

Country radio stations in the United States
AMZ
Radio stations established in 1966
IHeartMedia radio stations
1966 establishments in Kentucky